F-box only protein 31 is a protein that in humans is encoded by the FBXO31 gene.

Function 

Members of the F-box protein family, such as FBXO31, are characterized by an approximately 40-amino acid F-box motif. SCF complexes, formed by SKP1 (MIM 601434), cullin (see CUL1; MIM 603134), and F-box proteins, act as protein-ubiquitin ligases. F-box proteins interact with SKP1 through the F box, and they interact with ubiquitination targets through other protein interaction domains.

F-box protein FBXO31 directs degradation of MDM2 to facilitate p53-mediated growth arrest following genotoxic stress. the F-box protein FBXO31, a candidate tumor suppressor encoded in 16q24.3 for which there is loss of heterozygosity in various solid tumors, is responsible for promoting MDM2 degradation. Following genotoxic stress, FBXO31 is phosphorylated by the DNA damage serine/threonine kinase ATM, resulting in increased levels of FBXO31. FBXO31 then interacts with and directs the degradation of MDM2, which is dependent on phosphorylation of MDM2 by ATM. FBXO31-mediated loss of MDM2 leads to elevated levels of p53, resulting in growth arrest. In cells depleted of FBXO31, MDM2 is not degraded and p53 levels do not increase following genotoxic stress. Thus, FBXO31 is essential for the classic robust increase in p53 levels following DNA damage.

References

Further reading